Richlands is a locality in the Upper Lachlan Shire, New South Wales, Australia. It lies about 5 km north of Taralga and about 95 km south of Oberon on the road from Goulburn to Oberon and Bathurst. It had a school from June 1868 to August 1879, which was designated as a "provisional school" for eight months and then as a "half-time" school. It also had a school from 1884 to 1915 and from 1918 to 1953, classified most commonly as a "provisional school", but for periods as a "house to house", "half-time" or "public" school. It was called Abercrombie school until 1894.

References

Upper Lachlan Shire
Localities in New South Wales